Bell railway station is located on the Mernda line in Victoria, Australia. It serves the northern Melbourne suburb of Preston, and it opened on 8 October 1889 as Preston-Bell Street. It was renamed Bell on 1 August 1905.

History

Opening on 8 October 1889, when the Inner Circle line was extended from North Fitzroy to Reservoir, Bell station is named after nearby Bell Street, itself named after Francis Bell, a landowner in Coburg who had a property named "Bell Manor".

It was located adjacent to the former Bell Street level crossing, which was provided with boom barriers in 1969, replacing interlocked gates. In 1973, the platforms at the former ground level station were extended at the Up end of the station.

The station once had a goods yard, which was removed in 1986, leaving only a siding at the Up end of the station.

On 17 April 1988, the double line block signalling system between Bell and Reservoir was abolished, and replaced with automatic three position signalling. Also in that month, pedestrian gates were provided at the former Bell Street level crossing, in combination with the road boom barriers.

On 31 March 1999, the former ground level station building on Platform 1 was damaged by fire.

On 25 August 2008, Bell was upgraded to a Premium Station.

There were crossovers located at both ends of the station, and a signal box was located on the former ground level Platform 1, which had a signal panel to control lights and switches in an emergency. In 2012, the panel was abolished.

In January 2016, the Level Crossing Removal Project announced that the Bell Street level crossing would be removed by grade separation. At the time, it had not been decided how the separation would be achieved, but the rail-over option was later chosen. In February 2021, major construction began. On 30 May 2022, the station was closed to allow demolition and construction of the new station. On 5 September of that year, the rebuilt station opened.

Platforms and services

Bell has two side platforms. It is serviced by Metro Trains' Mernda line services.

Platform 1:
  all stations and limited express services to Flinders Street

Platform 2:
  all stations services to Mernda

Transport links

Dysons operates four routes via Bell station, under contract to Public Transport Victoria:
 : Eltham station – Glenroy station (via Lower Plenty)
 : Eltham station – Glenroy station (via Greensborough)
 : North East Reservoir – Northcote Plaza
 : Preston – West Preston

Gallery

References

External links
 
 Melway map at street-directory.com.au

Premium Melbourne railway stations
Railway stations in Melbourne
Railway stations in Australia opened in 1889
Railway stations in the City of Darebin